The Enemy Within is an adventure published by Games Workshop in 1986 for the fantasy role-playing game Warhammer Fantasy Roleplay.

Contents
The Enemy Within is the first of six linked adventures in The Enemy Within Campaign taking place in the Warhammer world, where hidden powers of Chaos plot the destruction of the Empire. The Enemy Within contains 
 a 56-page booklet
 a 22” x 34” color foldout map of the Empire
 two 11” x 17” card-stock sheets with player handouts, maps, diagrams, and gamemaster references

Most of the 56-page booklet outlines how to run a campaign, and summarizes the history and setting of the Empire. The balance of the booklet contains an adventure, "Mistaken Identity", which sets up the rest of the campaign.

Reception
In the August 1987 edition of Dragon (Issue #124), Ken Rolston thought "the designers effectively exploit the distinctive tone and campaign background of Warhammer Fantasy Roleplay." Rolston also admired the production values, saying, "the talented Games Workshop graphic design squad does a bang-up job on the look and feel of the package [...] The whole package has the agreeable heft of volume and the eye-pleasing impact of quality." However, Rolston felt the adventure railroaded the players, forcing them to follow a prescribed path. Despite this, he concluded with a thumbs up, saying, "The Enemy Within is recommended as a campaign supplement and adventure for WFR, and for students of superior supplement presentation. Despite the stated reservations about the adventure, the package is quite good and an indication that supplement support for WFR should be substantial and satisfying." 

In the July–August 1988 edition of  Space Gamer/Fantasy Gamer (Issue No. 82), Richard A. Edwards had high praise for this adventure, saying, "If you want to bring your roleplaying group a new experience in roleplaying and introduce them to new complexities of plot then run, do not walk, to your game store and purchase a copy."

Reviews
White Wolf #9 (1988)
 Casus Belli #37 (April 1987)

References

Role-playing game supplements introduced in 1986
Warhammer Fantasy Roleplay adventures